The Battle of Osca took place near Osca, north-eastern Spain, between the armies of the Roman Senate and the remnants of the Sertorian rebels. The battle took place ten days after the death of the rebel leader Sertorius.

Perperna, Sertorius's second-in-command, had murdered (assassinated) Sertorius, the leader of the rebellion, and had taken command of the Sertorian army. Pompey, the commander of the Roman legions in Hispania Citerior, upon hearing of Sertorius's death, marched his army directly to Osca, Sertorius's capital. Perperna, who needed a victory to cement his position as the new leader of the rebellion, marched his army out of Osca and took the field.

Perperna's army came across ten of Pompey's cohorts – a force of 2,500–5,000 men – and attacked. The Pompeian force broke and retreated drawing Perperna's army after them. It turned out to be a feigned retreat, they lured the rebels into an ambuscade. Perperna soon found his army surrounded on three sides, this is when the ten cohorts wheeled round and attacked him in the front while the rest of the Pompeian army attacked the flanks. The rebel army broke and fled pursued by the Romans, the final battle of the Sertorian War was over.

Perperna attempted to plead for his life, offering to give Pompey all of Sertorius's correspondence, which would document contacts with the highest levels of Roman government and society. Pompey indicated he would accept the papers, and when they had all been gathered together, he burned them, averting the possibility of another civil war. Perperna and all of the men who had murdered Sertorius were executed and Pompey spent the rest of the campaigning season mopping up the remaining rebel forces and taking their remaining stronghold.

Notes

References

Sources
 
 

1st century BC in Hispania
1st century BC in the Roman Republic
72 BC
73 BC
70s BC conflicts
Osca